Noble Savage is the third studio album of the American heavy metal band Virgin Steele, released in 1985 by Cobra Records. The album was reissued in 1997 on CD by Noise Records with six bonus tracks. The remastered edition of 2008 by Dockyard 1 added two other extra tracks. In May 2011, the album was reissued once more by Steamhammer Records, a subsidiary of SPV with the same track list as the 1997 release, but with an added bonus CD containing 13 additional tracks.

Before the recording of Noble Savage, original guitarist Jack Starr resigned from the band and was replaced by Edward Pursino, an old friend of DeFeis, whose guitar playing immediately fit very well with Virgin Steele's music and style. Pursino's contribution came also in the form of new musical ideas and compositions, and he is still a mainstay in Virgin Steele's line-up. The band's frontman David DeFeis considers this album one of the most important in the history of the band.

Noble Savage was the first album where the band was completely satisfied with its music and sound. It is also the first album on which the current musical style of the band is fully manifested, containing grandiose compositions with multi-layered keyboard sound and more sophisticated arrangements. Noble Savage has become one of the most popular Virgin Steele albums and it includes the songs "We Rule the Night" and "Noble Savage", which the band still plays in concert.

Track listing

Personnel

Band members 
 David DeFeis – vocals, keyboards, orchestration, producer
 Ed Pursino – all guitars
 Joe O'Reilly – bass
 Joey Ayvazian – drums

Production 
Al Falcon – engineer
Artie Ware, Jerry Comito – assistant engineers
Steve Young – remastering engineer
Hugh Syme – art direction and design
Dimo Safari – photos

References 

1985 albums
Virgin Steele albums